Jambes is a town of Wallonia and a district of the city of Namur, located in the province of Namur, Belgium. 

It was formerly a municipality itself until the fusion of Belgian municipalities in 1977.

Jambes is known for the former Géronsart Abbey, the 13th century Enhaive or Anhaive keep ( or Anhaive), the old bridge on the river Meuse and the seat of the Government of Wallonia (Élysette).

Transport

Railway
Jambes has two train stations: Jambes on the line 154 (Namur-Dinant) and Jambes-East on the line 161 (Namur-Luxembourg).

External links
 
 Jambes Tourism

Sub-municipalities of Namur (city)
Former municipalities of Namur (province)